Klitgaard is a Danish surname, referring to a farm ('gaard') in a dune ('klit'). As a place name it is found in a few locations in Northern Jutland.  As a surname it may refer to:

Christen Julius Klitgaard (born 1835), 50 year Danish Master Mariner, Knighted
Kasper Klitgaard (born 1979), Danish handball player
Mikael Klitgaard (born 1954), mayor of Brønderslev and formerly of Dronninglund
Mogens Klitgaard (1906–1945), Danish novelist
Peter Kurrild-Klitgaard (born 1966), Danish political scientist
Robert Klitgaard (born 1947), U.S. academic

Danish-language surnames